Warren Miller (August 31, 1921 – April 1, 1966) was an American writer. Although he gained some fame for his books dealing with issues of race, as in The Cool World (1959) and The Siege of Harlem (1964), and for his more political books such as Looking for The General (1964) and Flush Times (1962), because of his early death due to lung cancer and his outspoken political views he has remained relatively unknown.

Biography
He was born in a village in Pennsylvania where his grandfather kept the general store. He enrolled at the University of Iowa but part way through his studies he joined the US Army. While in uniform he took part in the Normandy invasion.

After the war he returned to complete his education and received his Bachelor's and Master's degrees from the University of Iowa, and was an instructor of literature there during the 1950s. He later worked in insurance. By 1956 he was manager of the Push Pin Studios, an advertising art agency in New York.

He wrote several novels during the 1950s and early '60s.  His novel Love Me Little was originally published under the pseudonym Amanda Vail.

Miller was married twice; first to a woman named Abby, then to a woman named Jane.  His first marriage produced two daughters, Scottie and Eve.

Bibliography 
 The Sleep of Reason, London: Secker & Warburg, 1956.
 The Bright Young Things, New York: Little Brown & Company, 1958. ASIN: B0007DVZKE
 "Chaos, Disorder, and the Late Show," in Hills, Penney Chapin, and L. Rust Hills, The Way We Live Now, New York: Little Brown & Company, 1958. ASIN: B000TWRGPQ
 The Cool World, New York: Little Brown & Company, 1959.  
 Love Me Little, New York: Bantam Books, 1959. ASIN: B0007HLGY0
 90 Miles From Home, New York: Little Brown & Company, 1961. ASIN: B000QJXMCS
 Flush Times, New York: Little Brown & Company, 1962. ASIN: B000KP0XS4
 Looking For The General, New York: McGraw-Hill, 1964. ASIN: B0007DKC94
 The Siege of Harlem, New York: McGraw-Hill, 1964. ASIN: B000EGMPVM

In other media 
The book The Cool World was first made into a play and then a movie in 1964 directed by Shirley Clarke, produced by Frederick Wiseman, and with musical score by Dizzy Gillespie.

References

Reviews 
 "Books: Jungle Book," Time Magazine review of The Cool World (June 15, 1959)
 "THEATER: Report from the Road," Time Magazine review of The Cool World play (February 15, 1960)
 "Books: Will THEY Never Come?," Time Magazine review of Looking For The General (January 17, 1964)
 "Books: Topical but Funny," Time Magazine review of The Siege of Harlem (August 14, 1964)

External links
 Warren Miller
 The Cool World Movie

20th-century American novelists
American male novelists
American social commentators
Novelists from Pennsylvania
1966 deaths
1921 births
20th-century American male writers
20th-century American non-fiction writers
American male non-fiction writers
United States Army personnel of World War II